"Blu celeste" is a song by Italian singer Blanco. It was released as a radio single on 10 September 2021 by Island Records and included in Blanco's debut album of the same name. It was written by Blanco and Michelangelo, and produced by Michelangelo.

The song peaked at number 1 on the FIMI single chart and was certified double platinum in Italy.

Music video
The music video for "Blu celeste", directed by Simone Peluso, was released on 9 September 2021 via Blanco's YouTube channel. , the video has over 16 million views on YouTube.

Personnel
Credits adapted from Tidal.
 Michelangelo – producer and composer
 Blanco – associated performer, author, vocals

Charts

Weekly charts

Year-end charts

Certifications

References

2021 singles
2021 songs
Island Records singles
Blanco (singer) songs
Songs written by Blanco (singer)